Hugo Armando (born on May 27, 1978) is an American former professional tour tennis player.

ATP career finals

Doubles (1 title)

External links
 
 

1978 births
Living people
American male tennis players
Sportspeople from Bradenton, Florida
Tennis players from Miami